Quark/4 is a 1971 anthology of short stories and poetry edited by Samuel R. Delany and Marilyn Hacker. It is the fourth and final volume in the Quark series.  The stories and poems are original to this anthology with the exception of "Voortrekker" which had previously appeared in the magazine Frendz.

Contents
 On Speculative Fiction, by Samuel R. Delany & Marilyn Hacker
 "Basileikon: Summe", by Avram Davidson
 "Voortrekker", by Michael Moorcock
 "Brass and Gold, or Horse and Zeppelin in Beverly Hills", by Philip José Farmer
 "The Song of Passing", by Marco Cacchioni
 "Norman Vs. America", by Charles Platt
 "The True Reason for the Dreadful Death of Mr. Rex Arundel", by Helen Adam
 "Acid Soap Opera", by Gail Madonia
 "Bodies", by Thomas M. Disch
 "Nightsong", by Marilyn Hacker
 "Cages", by Vonda N. McIntyre
 "Man of Letters", by Marek Obtulowicz
 "The Fourth Profession", by Larry Niven
 Twelve Drawings, by Olivier Olivier
 from The Day, by Stan Persky

References

1971 anthologies
Science fiction anthology series